John Joseph O'Hara (born February 7, 1946) is an American prelate of the Catholic Church, who served as an auxiliary bishop of the Archdiocese of New York from 2014 to 2021.

Biography

Early life 
O'Hara was born on February 7, 1946, in Jersey City, New Jersey, and was educated in a Catholic elementary school in Ridgewood, New Jersey, and at Don Bosco Preparatory High School in Ramsey, New Jersey. He earned a Bachelor of English degree from Seton Hall University in South Orange, New Jersey. O'Hara worked in broadcast journalism for 13 years before entering St. Joseph's Seminary in Yonkers, New York.

Priesthood 
O'Hara was ordained into the priesthood for the Archdiocese of New York by Archbishop John O'Connor on December 1, 1984.  His assignments, both in Staten Island, included St. Charles Parish' as parochial vicar from 1984 to 1992, and St. Teresa's Parish  from 1992 to 2012 as both parochial vicar and pastor.  O'Hara served as the director of strategic pastoral planning for the archdiocese from 2012 to 2022, where he led the "Making All Things New" planning process for parish mergers.

Auxiliary Bishop of New York
O'Hara was named titular bishop of Ath Truim and an auxiliary bishop of the Archdiocese of New York by Pope Francis on June 14, 2014. He was consecrated by Cardinal Timothy Dolan in St. Patrick's Cathedral in Manhattan on August 4, 2014.  Auxiliary bishops Gerald Walsh and Dominick Lagonegro were the co-consecrators. O'Hara's crosier had been used by the late Cardinal Terence Cooke, a former Archbishop of New York.

In October 2017, O'Hara intervened to force out the International Human Rights Art Festival from performing at one of the churches in his diocese, because of its gay and transgender content. The church offered to host the event if these specific acts were rejected, but the director of the festival declined. In contrast, after Staten Island's 2020 Saint Patrick's Parade was heavily criticized for excluding supporters of gay rights, O'Hara planned to meet with the "hard line" parade organizer to urge "change in the future".

Retirement 
On February 7, 2021, O'Hara reached the mandatory retirement age of 75 and submitted his letter of resignation as auxiliary bishop of the Archdiocese of New York to Pope Francis, as required by canon law. On April 7, 2021, the Pope accepted O'Hara's resignation.  He has continued to serve as episcopal vicar of Staten Island, joined by Bishop Peter John Byrne in 2022, and as vicar of planning for the archdiocese.

See also
 Catholic Church hierarchy
 Catholic Church in the United States
 Historical list of the Catholic bishops of the United States
 List of Catholic bishops of the United States
 Lists of patriarchs, archbishops, and bishops

References

 

1946 births
Living people
Clergy from Jersey City, New Jersey
Don Bosco Preparatory High School alumni
Seton Hall University alumni
Saint Joseph's Seminary (Dunwoodie) alumni
People of the Roman Catholic Archdiocese of New York
21st-century American Roman Catholic titular bishops
Roman Catholic bishops in New York (state)
Catholics from New Jersey
Bishops appointed by Pope Francis